Route 68 is a  south–north state highway in Massachusetts. Its southern terminus is at Route 122A in Holden and its northern terminus is at Route 32 in Royalston. Along the way it intersects Route 2 in Gardner and U.S. Route 202 (US 202) in Templeton.

Route description

Route 68 begins in the Jefferson section of the town of Holden, at Route 122A.  It heads northward into Rutland, passing through the northeastern part of the town, passing the northern end of Route 56.  It then heads into Hubbardston, crossing Route 62 and passing through the center of town before bending more northeasterly into the city of Gardner.

In Gardner, Route 68 crosses Route 2A and Route 2, the latter at Exit 86 (old exit 22). It heads to the center of the city and turns westward, concurrent with Route 101 for a quarter mile before turning northwestward. Route 68 heads into Templeton before joining U.S. Route 202 for a wrong-way concurrency for  through the Baldwinville section of town, before turning northwestward again. The route passes through the far northern portion of neighboring Phillipston before entering Royalston. In Royalston, the route winds slowly through the woods and hills, crossing the Millers River and heading northward through the center of the town. It finally ends at Route 32, just two miles south of the New Hampshire state line.

Major intersections

References

068
Transportation in Worcester County, Massachusetts